Atriceps Island is the southernmost of the Robertson Islands, lying  south of the south-east end of Coronation Island in the South Orkney Islands of Antarctica.  The island has been identified as an Important Bird Area by BirdLife International because it supports a breeding colony of imperial shags (Phalacrocorax atriceps), after which the island was named in 1948–49 by the Falkland Islands Dependencies Survey, with 524 pairs recorded in 1988.

See also 
 List of Antarctic and subantarctic islands

References

 

Islands of the South Orkney Islands
Important Bird Areas of Antarctica
Seabird colonies